Ikko (born  on 20 January 1962 in Fukuoka Prefecture), stylized as IKKO, is a Japanese make-up artist, TV personality, and actress. The name "Ikko" comes from an alternative reading of the Japanese name "一幸" (Ikkō).

Biography
Born on 20 January 1962, Ikko experienced gender dysphoria and became socially withdrawn as a teenager. She graduated from a beauty college in Fukuoka Prefecture and trained as a make-up artist for eight years before opening the make-up studio "Atelier Ikko" in 1992. In 2007, she released the single "Dondake no Hōsoku" or “The Law of Dondake,” popularizing the term dondake. As a make-up artist, she promotes Korean beauty products. She regularly appeared on the television program "Onē MANS."

Ikko is a trans woman. She speaks in onē kotoba.

TV appearances
, Ikko regularly appears on the following TV programmes.
  (Nippon Television)
  (Mainichi Broadcasting System)
  (Fukuoka Broadcasting System, Wednesday commentator)
 Inspector Totsukawa series (Takeshi Naito) (2018) - momo-mama

Film
Umami (2021), role: "Matsuba"  (Director: Slony Sow)

Books
Ikko has published the following books.
 IKKOの振袖ロマンティック, 2004, 
 IKKOウェディング――永遠のガーリッシュウェディング, 2005, 
 超オンナ磨き〜美のカリスマIKKOの幸せを呼ぶゴールデンルール, July 2006,

Music
In December 2007, Ikko released a CD single titled "Dondake no Hōsoku." The single also included a cover of "Dō ni mo tomaranai," a 1972 hit song originally performed by Linda Yamamoto.

References

External links
  

Japanese LGBT musicians
Japanese transgender people
1962 births
Living people
Japanese make-up artists
Japanese television personalities
Transgender women